Dimus Chisala (born 23 December 1962) is a Zambian boxer. He competed at the 1984 Summer Olympics and the 1988 Summer Olympics. At the 1984 Summer Olympics, he lost to Charles Nwokolo of Nigeria.

References

1962 births
Living people
Zambian male boxers
Olympic boxers of Zambia
Boxers at the 1984 Summer Olympics
Boxers at the 1988 Summer Olympics
Place of birth missing (living people)
Light-welterweight boxers